Mladen Šubić may refer to:

 Mladen I Šubić (d. 1304), Croatian nobleman, member of the Šubić family of Bribir
 Mladen II Šubić (1270–1343), Croatian nobleman, member of the Šubić family of Bribir
 Mladen III Šubić (c. 1315–1348), Croatian nobleman, member of the Šubić family of Bribir